"FBI and FBI: Most Wanted crossover" is a two-part crossover event between FBI and FBI: Most Wanted that aired on CBS. The event aired on March 24, 2020, with the FBI episode "American Dreams", followed by the  FBI: Most Wanted episode "Reveille". Julian McMahon, Keisha Castle-Hughes, Kellan Lutz, Roxy Sternberg, Zeeko Zaki, Ebonée Noel, John Boyd, Alana de la Garza, and Jeremy Sisto appeared in both parts of the event as Jess LaCroix, Hana Gibson, Ken Crosby, Sheryll Barnes, Omar Adom "O. A." Agent Zidan, Kristen Chazal, Stuart Scola, Isobel Castille, Jubal Valentine, respectively.

Cast and characters

Main
The following contains a list of actors receiving main billing in the crossover event:

Guests
The following contains a list of notable guests appearing in the crossover event:

Plot

Part 1: "American Dreams"
A school bus with 26 elementary students is hijacked, sending the FBI into a desperate race against to find them. With Maggie away on her undercover mission, Jess LaCroix of the FBI Fugitive Task Force and his team later join the New York team due to the fact that Sam Givens, one of the suspects behind the kidnapping is a man Jess previously arrested with Jess's team of agents Sheryl Barnes, Hana Gibson and Kenny Crosby meeting OA, Emily Ryder, Scola and Jubal for the first time. After a series of dead ends and even finding Givens dead in the back of a truck, they eventually determine that the kids are being held at an Amusement Park which Jubal identifies as "Play Town" due to one of the children, Owen Jamison using it via sign language which he used to communicate during a video message and that the man responsible for the abduction is Tyler Kane, a violent white supremacist. They apprehend Kane even though he's left wounded after OA shoots him, and find 25 of the 26 kids (Owen was saved earlier by his parents who cut a deal with the terrorist) with the FBI teams bringing the children to safety. However, Owen has gone missing, prompting Jess and OA to investigate. They head to the Jamison house and discover that Owen's father paid the ransom to the terrorists and got his son back. As Jess and OA leave the house, having finished their interview, OA grimly remarks that this isn't over. Jess then receives a video message from his young daughter, Tali, informing him that the food bank she volunteers at is being raided before her phone is taken away by a group of ICE agents with OA telling Jess, "Let's go".

Part 2: "Reveille"
As Jess works to get his daughter, Talia who's been taken on suspicion of being an illegal immigrant due to her skin color back from ICE even though he faces resistance from the ICE Director Austin Stevens, he, his team of the FBI Fugitive Task Force and the New York FBI field office continue searching for Emma Kane, the wife of Tyler Kane who escaped in "American Dreams" with Kane later making her presence known once more by killing twelve illegal immigrant women and injuring thirteen others. She also posts a video to YouTube, believing that her husband is dead while urging the white people to wake and rise, hoping to trigger a race war. Barnes, Jess and OA visit Tyler at the hospital and try to get him to tell them of Emma's whereabouts but Tyler refuses, informing the three agents that he and his group are stopping the white genocide and that the day of reckoning is coming. Meanwhile, Jess continues searching for Tali but finds himself getting nowhere and later receives an anonymous message on his phone asking him to read out the demands of a white supremacist group or Tali will be sent to South America and possibly jumped into MS13. Jess holds the press conference but goes off-script, refusing to read the message, something OA and both Assistant Special Agent in charge Jubal Valentine thank him for, Jubal believing Jess did it without the PC niceties. Jess then figures out that Emma wanted babies of her own to contribute to a whiter America but gave up due to the pills they were using having expired a year ago. OA and then arrive in, telling Jess and Barnes that the Kanes have been traveling up and down the country for the last while, their phones having pinned them at numerous locations including Boston and Buffalo. Scola and Hana later arrive into the conference room, revealing that they've uncovered a website that Stevens spends an hour on every day, one that is very far-right and has jokes and memes about illegal immigrants. Heading back into the main area, Jubal informs the agents and analysts of the website while also expressing his anger and disgust at the website, believing the bad apples posting on the site are bringing shame on every single federal employee before he orders the room to dig into the website. He then has Scola collect the name and pass them to the IG's office and Homeland Security. During one search, Kristen Chazal finds a photo showing Stevens and another ICE colleague of his fishing while using the white power sign. She informs Jess and the team of this while Hana reveals that another of the ICE agents, Michael Rees owns a detention centre in Georgia. Jess and his brother-in-law, FBI Special Agent Clinton Skye travel to the facility and after arresting Reese, Jess is reunited with Tali. Meanwhile, Barnes, Hana and Crosby confront Joey Carter, Bob Carter's son and engage in a gunfight that ends with the three agents shooting Carter. Searching the trunk, they discover a man's dead body with Hana revealing the man is a janitor with access and keys to thirty properties. Doubling back, the team dig into the victim's past and learn that he did community service in Ulster County with OA realizing that the group are targeting the citizenship ceremony where his aunt along with many others will be sworn in as American citizens. Racing to the building where the ceremony's taking place, OA is frustrated at his inability to contact his relatives while Jess believes that after OA shot Kane, the group did the same thing they did to Jess in revenge: they hacked his life. The team later arrive at the building and split up into separate groups: Posing as a couple on a jog, Hana and Crosby go searching for Emma's accomplices, Jess searches for Emma herself, OA discreetly escorts the people out of the building including his aunt under the pretence of offering photographs as Barnes and a team of FBI agents search for the bomb. Eventually, Hana and Crosby arrest Emma's two accomplices while OA finds his aunt and helps her to safety while Barnes and her team find the bomb inside a cooler down in a locker room, Barnes grimly informing Jess they're going to disarm it as there's enough explosives to bring down the entire building. Jess confronts Emma in a park and tries to get her to surrender but when it becomes obvious Emma is planning on going through with the attack in an attempt to prove her worth to Tyler while vowing she'll show him, Jess steps back, allowing Clinton who had been manning a sniper rifle to fatally shoot Emma in the head, killing her and allowing Jess to seize control of the remote she planned on using to set off the bomb, preventing the explosion from occurring. With Barnes's team having disarmed the bomb and all the main suspects either dead or in custody, the case has been solved. A while later, in another new location, possibly a courthouse, OA watches as his aunt is sworn as an American citizen with Jess and Tali, OA having invited the two of them to join him.

Production
The shows were previously set in the same universe with the backdoor pilot for FBI: Most Wanted which aired as part of FBI. The backdoor pilot was titled "Most Wanted", and aired on April 2, 2019.

Release
The crossover was originally set to air a week earlier on March 17, 2020, but ended up being pushed back a week.

Reception

Critical response
Brittany Frederick with One Chicago Center said "the episodes were perfectly structured, in that one story was pretty much tied up at the end of hour one (great for syndication), but there was enough story left to go on that it felt natural to extend it into another hour." and "they did a good job of getting at least one big scene for every series regular involved in the event."

Viewing figures
In the United States the first part of the crossover was watched live by 10.67 million viewers, and 14.57 million within seven days. The second part was watched live by 9.49 million viewers, and 12.95 million within seven days. Both parts were the most watched episode of their respective series.

Notes

References

2020 American television episodes
FBI (franchise)
FBI (TV series)
FBI: Most Wanted
Television crossover episodes